Enn Rajasaar (born 8 November 1961 in Tartu) is an Estonian architect.

Enn Rajasaar studied in the State Art Institute of the Estonian SSR (today's Estonian Academy of Arts) in the department of architecture. He graduated from the institute in 1985.

From 1985 to 1990 Enn Rajasaar worked in the Tallinn office of the soviet design bureau Tsentrosojuz Projekt. From 1990 he has worked in the architectural bureau JVR OÜ.

Notable part of projects by Enn Rajasaar are various apartment buildings and single-family houses. In addition he has participated successfully in numerous architectural competitions. Enn Rajasaar is a member of the Union of Estonian Architects.

Works
AS Maseko office building, 1998
Reconstruction of an apartment building, 2000
International style housing in Tabasalu, 2002
Apartment building on Weizenbergi Street, 2005
Apartment building on Köleri Street, 2005
Apartment buildings on Roheline Aas Street, 2006
Apartment building with offices on Narva road, 2007
Row housing on Särje street, 2008

References
 Union of Estonian Architects, members
 Architectural Bureau JVR Arhitektuuribüroo OÜ, architects

1961 births
Living people
Estonian architects
People from Tartu
Estonian Academy of Arts alumni